Robert Weinstein (born October 18, 1954) is an American film producer. He is the founder and head of Dimension Films, former co-chairman of Miramax Films and The Weinstein Company (TWC), all of which he co-founded with his older brother, Harvey. He has focused on making action and horror films.

Early life 
Weinstein was born in Flushing, Queens, in New York City. He was raised in an Ashkenazi Jewish family. His parents were Max Weinstein, a diamond cutter, and Miriam (née Postel). He grew up with his older brother, Harvey Weinstein, in a housing co-op named Electchester in New York City. and attended John Bowne High School like his older brother.

Career 
Bob, his brother Harvey Weinstein, and Corky Burger independently produced rock concerts as Harvey & Corky Productions in Buffalo through most of the 1970s. Both Weinstein brothers had grown up with a passion for movies, and they nurtured a desire to enter the film industry.

In the late 1970s, using profits from their concert promotion business, the brothers created a small independent film distribution company called Miramax, named after their parents Miriam and Max. The company's first releases were primarily music-oriented concert films, such as Paul McCartney's Rockshow. In the early 1980s, Miramax acquired the rights to two British films of benefit shows filmed for the human rights organization Amnesty International. Working closely with Martin Lewis, the producer of the original films, the Weinstein brothers edited the two films into one movie tailored for the American market. The resulting film, released as The Secret Policeman's Other Ball in May 1982, became Miramax's first hit. The movie raised considerable sums for Amnesty International and was credited by Amnesty with having helped to raise its profile in the US.

The Weinsteins slowly built upon this success throughout the 1980s with arthouse films that achieved critical attention and modest commercial success. Harvey Weinstein and Miramax gained wider attention in 1988 with the release of Errol Morris' documentary The Thin Blue Line, which detailed the struggle of Randall Adams, a wrongfully convicted inmate sentenced to death row. The publicity that soon surrounded the case resulted in Adams' release and nationwide publicity for Miramax. The following year, their successful launch release of Steven Soderbergh's Sex, Lies, and Videotape propelled Miramax to become the most successful independent studio in America.

Miramax continued to grow its library of films and directors until, in 1993, Disney offered Harvey and Bob $80 million for ownership of Miramax. Agreeing to the deal that would cement their Hollywood clout and ensure that they would remain at the head of their company, Miramax followed the next year with their first blockbuster, Quentin Tarantino's Pulp Fiction.

1996 brought Miramax's first Academy Award for Best Picture with the victory of The English Patient. This would start a string of critical successes that would include Good Will Hunting and Shakespeare in Love.

On March 29, 2005, it was announced that the Weinstein brothers would leave Miramax on September 30 and would form their own production company, The Weinstein Company (TWC). Five years later, in 2010, Disney sold Miramax to the Qatari group Filmyard Holdings, who in turn sold it to another Qatari entity, the beIN Media Group, in 2016.

On December 4, 2017, Bob Weinstein filed a trademark application for Watch This Entertainment. Almost two years later, Weinstein announced his new production company to the world, with a focus on "family films, comedies and upscale adult thrillers", and a first project of an animated feature titled Endangered, with Téa Leoni serving as co-producer and voicing a lead character.

Personal life 
Weinstein has been married and divorced twice. He married Anne Clayton, a former book editor, in 2000. They lived in a large apartment in The Beresford at 7 West 81st Street on the Upper West Side.  Anne filed for divorce in April 2012, and sought a protective order because she feared "bodily harm". Weinstein issued a statement from Washington-based interventionist Don Sloane, denying that Weinstein was a danger to his wife, and alleging that she was reacting to a family intervention conducted to address her alcoholism. Her lawyers denied that she suffered from any addiction and said that Sloane was her husband's "paid agent" and that the two had never met.

Sexual misconduct allegations 
In October 2017, Bob Weinstein was accused of sexual harassment by Amanda Segel, who had worked as a showrunner on the Weinstein Company-produced Spike TV miniseries The Mist. Segel alleged that Weinstein had made several unwanted sexual overtures to her beginning in June 2016 and continuing for three months. Weinstein's attorney Bert Fields issued a statement denying the allegations.

Segel's allegation came in the context of the sexual abuse cases against Weinstein's brother, Harvey. In October 2017, Weinstein spoke about the allegations of sex crimes against his brother, and said he was "sick and disgusted" by Harvey's actions. Weinstein denied knowing about any of his brother's crimes before the allegations became public, and he said he had rarely spoken to his brother in the previous five years because he "could not take his cheating, his lying and also his attitude toward everyone".

Selected filmography

Executive producer

Producer 
 Playing for Keeps (1986)
 Restoration (1995), co-producer
 Mimic (1997)
 Reindeer Games (2000)
 Master and Commander: The Far Side of the World (2003), co-producer (uncredited)
 Bad Santa (2003)

Director 
 Playing for Keeps (1986)

Writer 
 The Burning (1981)

Broadway credits 
Note: In all productions Weinstein has functioned as a co-producer with other producers.
 The Real Thing (2000 revival) – play – produced by Miramax Films – Tony Award for Best Revival of a Play, Drama Desk Award for Outstanding Revival of a Play
 The Producers (2001) – musical – Tony Award for Best Musical, Drama Desk Award for Outstanding New Musical
 Sweet Smell of Success (2002) – musical – Tony Nomination for Best Musical, Drama Desk Nomination for Outstanding New Musical
 La bohème (2003 revival) – opera – Tony Nomination for Best Revival of a Musical, Drama Desk Nomination for Outstanding Revival of a Musical
 All Shook Up (2005) – musical – produced by Bob Weinstein & Miramax Films
 The Color Purple (2005) – musical

Accolades

References

External links 
 

1954 births
Living people
20th-century American Jews
American film producers
American film studio executives
American film production company founders
American theatre managers and producers
Businesspeople from Connecticut
Businesspeople from New York City
Miramax people
People from Queens, New York
The Weinstein Company people
Golden Globe Award-winning producers
American independent film production company founders
21st-century American Jews
American Ashkenazi Jews